Nemobius is a genus of crickets in the family Trigonidiidae.

Species
The Orthoptera Species File lists:
Nemobius grandis Holdhaus, 1909 - Samoa
Nemobius interstitialis Barranco, Gilgado & Ortuño, 2013 - Spain
Nemobius karnyi Chopard, 1925 - Java
Nemobius piracicabae Piza, 1968 - Brasil
Nemobius strigipennis Chopard, 1928 - India
Nemobius sylvestris Bosc, 1792 - Europe, N. Africa- type species (as Acheta sylvestris Bosc = N. sylvestris sylvestris)

References

External links
 
 

Orthoptera genera
Trigonidiidae